Alexis Koubroglou (born 14 August 1991) is a professional Greek football player, currently playing for Kavala F.C. in the Greek Football League.

He started his professional career with his current club Doxa Drama in 2009. In summer 2010, he moved on a season-long loan to Fokikos, making 26 appearances and scoring 4 goals in the Football League 2.

References

1991 births
Living people
Doxa Drama F.C. players
Super League Greece players
Greek footballers
Association football forwards
Footballers from Drama, Greece